Silver Explorer is an expedition ship operated by Silversea Cruises. The ship typically hosts cruises to Norway, the South Pacific, and Antarctica. It is the first ship of Silversea involved in expedition cruising.

Design and construction

Silver Explorer is a 1A ice-rated vessel. She carries up to 144 passengers in 72 cabins. The ship was built by the yards of Rauma-Repola, of Rauma, Finland, and launched on 3 February 1989. She operated under several names before being acquired by Society Expeditions, who operated her under the names World Adventurer and World Discoverer. the ship was launched service in 1994, and it was the first luxury to branch off in the expedition market in 2008 with the Silver Explorer.

She was purchased by Silversea Cruises in autumn 2007, and underwent a multimillion-pound refit at Fincantieri, Trieste. In June 2008, at a ceremony in Monte Carlo attended by Prince Albert II of Monaco, she was re-christened Prince Albert II. She then sailed to London to embark passengers for an inaugural cruise. Silver Explorer was refurbished in 2017, expanding its passenger capacity to 144 in 72 cabins, While on 21 April 2020, Silversea launched a new measures for the ship to offer unprecedented flexibility to the passengers.

Prince Albert II was renamed Silver Explorer in late April 2011 in order to align with the fleet's other vessels which all have the word Silver in their name. 

Silversea launched an event Sell and Sail Free promotion, inviting also U.S. and Canada travel agents in February 2020.

Service
Silver Explorer operates polar adventure cruises lasting between 10 and 27 days. In the summer she cruises in the Arctic Circle and the Northeast Passage with calls at the Svalbard archipelago, Iceland and Greenland. During the northern hemisphere autumn and winter, she cruises off South America and Antarctica. She is the world's first ultra-luxury cruise ship to sail to Antarctica.

In 2018, the ship anchored at Coos Bay and docked in North Bend, chartered by a group of 130 golfers. In 2019, the ship was successful for crossing the Northwest Passage for the first time in Arctic pack ice, being also accompanied by a Russian icebreaker. In December 2019, the ship made a maiden voyage to Sokcho, South Korea as the first Silversea ship to visit the port.

In January 2022, the ship was sold to the expedition cruising company Exploris. It will be transferred to Exploris in September 2023 to begin sailing in December 2023.

Incidents
In June 2019, after the ship was sailing into Bering Sea it entangled in a fishing net which caused propeller damage, forcing them way to drydock for repairs.
On 15 March 2020, during the COVID-19 pandemic on cruise ships, the ship docked in Castro, Chile, with 111 passengers and 120 crew, after an 83-year-old man fell ill and tested positive for COVID-19.

References

External links

 Official website

Cruise ships
Expedition cruising
1989 ships
Ships built in Rauma, Finland
Cruise ships involved in the COVID-19 pandemic